Haplophthalmus is a genus of woodlice in family Trichoniscidae. It contains 47 described species, of which two are listed as vulnerable species on the IUCN Red List – Haplophthalmus abbreviatus (endemic to Slovenia) and Haplophthalmus rhinoceros (Croatia and Slovenia).

Species

Haplophthalmus abbreviatus Verhoeff, 1928
Haplophthalmus alicantinus Cruz & Dalens, 1990
Haplophthalmus apuanus Verhoeff, 1908
Haplophthalmus asturicus Vandel, 1952
Haplophthalmus aternanus Verhoeff, 1931
Haplophthalmus austriacus Verhoeff, 1940
Haplophthalmus avolensis Vandel, 1969
Haplophthalmus banaticus Radu, 1983
Haplophthalmus bituberculatus Strouhal, 1963
Haplophthalmus bodadonai Legrand & Vandel, 1950
Haplophthalmus caecus Radu, Radu & Cadaru, 1955
Haplophthalmus chisterai Cruz & Dalens, 1990
Haplophthalmus claviger Verhoeff, 1944
Haplophthalmus concordiae Verhoeff, 1952
Haplophthalmus dalmaticus Buturović, 1955
Haplophthalmus danicus Budde-Lund, 1879
Haplophthalmus delmontensis Verhoeff, 1936
Haplophthalmus fiumaranus Verhoeff, 1908
Haplophthalmus gibbosus Verhoeff, 1930
Haplophthalmus gibbus Legrand & Vandel, 1950
Haplophthalmus hungaricus Kesselyak, 1930
Haplophthalmus intermedius Frankenberger, 1941
Haplophthalmus ionescui Radu, 1983
Haplophthalmus kosswigi Strouhal, 1963
Haplophthalmus ligurinus Verhoeff, 1930
Haplophthalmus litoralis Verhoeff, 1952
Haplophthalmus lombardicus Strouhal, 1948
Haplophthalmus mariae Strouhal, 1953
Haplophthalmus medius Radu, Radu & Cadaru, 1956
Haplophthalmus mengii (Zaddach, 1844)
Haplophthalmus meridionalis Legrand & Vandel, 1950
Haplophthalmus monticellii Arcangeli, 1922
Haplophthalmus montivagus Verhoeff, 1940
Haplophthalmus movilae Gruia & Giurginca, 1998
Haplophthalmus napocensis Radu, 1983
Haplophthalmus orientalis Radu, Radu & Cadaru, 1956
Haplophthalmus portofinensis Verhoeff, 1908
Haplophthalmus provincialis Legrand & Legrand, 1950
Haplophthalmus pumilio Verhoeff, 1944
Haplophthalmus rhinoceros Verhoeff, 1930
Haplophthalmus siculus Dollfus, 1896
Haplophthalmus stygivagus Verhoeff, 1936
Haplophthalmus teissieri Legrand, 1942
Haplophthalmus tismanicus Tabacaru, 1970
Haplophthalmus transiens Legrand & Vandel, 1950
Haplophthalmus unituberculatus Vandel, 1955
Haplophthalmus valenciae Cruz & Dalens, 1990

References

Woodlice
Taxonomy articles created by Polbot